Freedom Square is a plaza on the southern end of the Old Town in Tallinn, Estonia, where state functions and various concerts take place. 
It is bounded on the east by St. John's Church (built 1862–67), on the south by Kaarli Boulevard and an underground shopping center (2008–09), and on the west by a Victory Column (2009) commemorating the Estonian War of Independence 1918–1920.

Design 
The current design was created by architects Tiit Trummal, Veljo Kaasik and Andres Alver. Before 2010, it was a parking lot. It has an area of 7752 m2 with the dimensions approx. 110 m by 75 m.

Nearly places 
 War of Independence Victory Column
 St. John's Church, Tallinn
 Palace Hotel
 Georg Ots Tallinn Music College 
 Russian Theatre
 Tallinn City Government Building
 Tallinn Art Hall
 Estonian Artists' Association
 Estonian Centre for Contemporary Art

History

Pre-republic 
The square arose on the site of the Swedish bastion in front of the Harju Gate, which was demolished in the middle of the 19th century. In 1867, the St. John's Church was erected on the square. In 1910, the Haymarket was liquidated on the square, and the square was paved with stones. On the 200th anniversary of the capture of the city by the Russian Empire, a monument to Peter I was erected on the square, which was dismantled on 1 May 1922.

First Republic 
In 1935, the area of the square was expanded. The boulevards were relocated and almost 2,500 square meters of new space was built under the square.

Soviet era 

On 29 April 1941, Freedom Square was named to Victory Square after the beginning Soviet occupation of Estonia. In the autumn of 1941, after the arrival of the German Wehrmacht, the name of Freedom Square was restored. On 22 September 1944, the Red Army entered Tallinn and by 1948, it was reverted to Victory Square. During the Soviet period, Freedom Square was known as the Victory Square. In the USSR, the square hosted parades in honor of holidays like Victory Day, the October Revolution, and before 1969, International Workers' Day.

Modern Freedom Square 
The Cross of Liberty and the Monument to the War of Independence was opened on 23 June 2009 as a memorial for those who fell during the Estonian War of Independence.

Gallery

See also
 Independence War Victory Column
 Town Hall Square, Tallinn

References

Squares in Tallinn